Musique à la Carte (French for Music from the Menu) is an album released by Kokia, on September 15, 2010. It is an album composed entirely of covers of songs by Western artists.

Background

Of the 13 songs on the album, 8 were already released before the album in Kokia's discography. The earliest, "Moonlight Shadow," was released in 2002 on Kokia's single "Ningen tte Sonna Mono ne." Four are from Kokia's 2008 10th anniversary projects Fairy Dance: Kokia Meets Ireland and Christmas Gift, and three are B-sides from the 'life trilogy' of digital singles released prior to her 2010 studio album Real World.

Of the five new recordings, three were recorded in Ireland with Sean Whelan ("Love Me Tender," "Over the Rainbow" and "Scarborough Fair").

Track listing

Chart rankings

Reported sales

References

2010 albums
Kokia (singer) albums
Victor Entertainment albums
Covers albums